Helictosperma is a genus of flowering plants belonging to the family Rubiaceae.

Its native range is Madagascar.

Species:

Helictosperma malacophyllum 
Helictosperma poissonianum

References

Rubiaceae
Rubiaceae genera